The Pešter Plateau, or simply Pešter, is a karst plateau in southwestern Serbia, in the Raška (or Sandžak) region.

It lies at the altitude of 1150–1492 m, (Kuljarski vrh) at 1492 meters. The territory of the plateau is mostly located in the municipality of Sjenica, with parts belonging to Novi Pazar and Tutin.

Name
The name of the region comes from the common Slavic word for cave.

In the speech of people native to the area, the original feminine gender of the word is preserved despite the loss of the -a ending (nominative Pešter, genitive and locative Pešteri), but in standard Serbian the gender is masculine (nominative Pešter, genitive Peštera, locative  Pešteru).

Geography

The plateau is actually a large field (Peštersko polje) surrounded by mountains of Jadovnik (1734 m), Zlatar (1627 m), Ozren (1693 m), Giljeva (1617 m), Javor (1519 m), Golija (1833 m), Žilindar (1616 m), Hum (1756 m), Ninaja (1462 m) and Jarut (1428 m).

With the area of around 50 km2, the Pešter field is the largest field in Serbia, and the highest one in the Balkans. The rivers of Uvac, Vapa, Jablanica and Grabovica flow through this plateau.

In the geologic past, the field was a large lake, of which only a small lake (in Sjenica) near the village of Tuzinje remained. The soil is mostly karst interspersed with pastures. Economy of the area relies primarily on cattle breeding, chiefly sheep.

Pešter is famous for its dairy products, especially the "Sjenica cheese" (Sjenički sir), as well as lamb and pršut (or prosciutto).

The plateau is sparsely populated: most settlements are on the edge of the field, and the remainder is settled only during summer months.

Pešter is famous for its microclimate, which is particularly harsh in the winter months, and due to this, it is often called the "Siberia of Sandžak".

The lowest temperature in Serbia since measurements are taken,  is measured at Karajukića Bunari village on 26 January 2006, beating the previous record of  measured in Sjenica in 1954.

In the near geological past, the field used to be a highland lake, which gradually drained through karst ruptures, leaving marshy remnants in the lowest parts, around the flow of the sinking river Boroštica. Those areas are home to a wet peatbog habitat that's unique for a karst area.

On the 1st of May in 2006, Ramsar included the wetland area of 3,455 hectares into its list of wetlands of international importance.

Pešter is home to a number of endangered plant species, such as Fumana bonapartei, Halacsya sendtneri, and Orchis tridentata. The only nesting place of Montagu's harrier in Serbia is in this area.

History
In 1700 the High Porte of the Ottoman Empire instructed the Pasha of Peja to pacify Rugova, resulting in 274 families being displaced from Rugova to Pešter. At that time, some members of the Shkreli and Kelmendi have begun migrating into the Pešter region.

The Kelmendi chief had converted to Islam, and promised to convert his fellow tribe members as well. A total of 251 Kelmendi households (1,987 people) were resettled in the Pešter area on that occasion, however five years later, the exiled Kelmendi managed to fight their way back to their homeland, and in 1711 they sent out a large raiding force to bring back some other from the Pešter region as well.

The remaining Kelmendi and Shkreli converted to Islam and became Slavophones by the 20th century, and as of today they now self-identify as part of the Bosniak ethnicity, although in the Pešter plateau they partly utilized the Albanian language until the middle of the 20th century particuarily in the villages of Ugao, Boroštica, Doliće and Gradac.

Factors such as some intermarriage undertaken by two generations with the surrounding Bosniak population along with the difficult circumstances of the Yugoslav Wars during the 90s made the local Albanians opt to refer to themselves in censuses as Bosniaks, in order to avoid persecution by the Serb-dominated government. Shkrelis continued to migrate from Rugova to the territory of Pešter until the 19th century.

Catholic Albanian groups which settled in the early 18th century were converted to Islam in that period. Their descendants make up the large majority of the population of the Pešter plateau.

Gallery

See also
Regions of Serbia

References

External links

Ivanjica - Golija - Pešterska visoravan - Moravac – a hiking tour through Pešter and Golija 
 Rezervati prirode - Peštersko polje at the Institute for Nature Conservation of Serbia

Sandžak
Ramsar sites in Serbia
Plateaus of Serbia
Sjenica
Novi Pazar
Tutin, Serbia
Geographical regions of Serbia
Geography of Šumadija and Western Serbia
Albanian communities in Serbia